Folks Like Us is the eighth studio album by American country music duo Montgomery Gentry. It was released on June 9, 2015 via Blaster Records as their only studio album for the label. "Headlights" and the title track were released as singles.

Content
Troy Gentry described the title track as " a song about American society and making ends meet. It's about being patriotic and showing your faith and the love of family. It's one of those blue-collar songs that we've been known for doing for so long."

Critical reception
Stephen Thomas Erlewine of Allmusic rated it 3 out of 5 stars, stating that " Montgomery Gentry are comfortable where they are, alternating rocking country with strong sentiment."

Track listing

Personnel
Credits by AllMusic

Montgomery Gentry
Troy Gentry - vocals
Eddie Montgomery - vocals

Additional Musicians
Kurt Allison - electric guitar
Perry Coleman - background vocals
Shalacy Griffin - background vocals
Tania Hancheroff - background vocals
Tony Harrell - Hammond B-3 organ, keyboards, Wurlitzer
Tully Kennedy - bass guitar
Danny Rader - banjo, acoustic guitar
Rich Redmond - drum programming, drums, percussion
Adam Shoenfeld - electric guitar

Chart performance
Album

Singles

References

2015 albums
Montgomery Gentry albums
Albums produced by Michael Knox (record producer)